The 1997 European Karate Championships was held in Santa Cruz de Tenerife, Spain from 2-4 May 1997.

Competition

Team

Women's competition

Individual

Team

Medal table

References

External links
 Karate Records - European Championship 1997

1997
International karate competitions hosted by Spain
European Karate Championships
European championships in 1997
Sport in Tenerife
Karate competitions in Spain